Bhagirath Prasad (born 3 July 1947) is an Indian Member of Parliament, who represents the Bharatiya Janata Party in the Lok Sabha (lower house), for the Bhind Lok Sabha constituency in Madhya Pradesh state.

References

1947 births
Living people
India MPs 2014–2019
People from Bhind district
Lok Sabha members from Madhya Pradesh
Bharatiya Janata Party politicians from Madhya Pradesh